The Watta were an indigenous Australian people of the Northern Territory.

Country

Social organization and practices
The Watta are notable for the fact that they constitute the most southeastern tribe which refrained from the rites of circumcision in the Northern territory.

Alternative names
 Wada
 Wad:a
 Wadjigim (?)
 Marigianbirik

Notes

Citations

Sources

Aboriginal peoples of the Northern Territory